Commando 3 is a 2019 Indian Hindi-language action thriller film directed by Aditya Datt and produced by Vipul Amrutlal Shah, Reliance Entertainment. The film is the sequel of Commando: A One Man Army (2013) and Commando 2: The Black Money Trail (2017). The third installment of Commando film series, the film features Vidyut Jammwal, Adah Sharma, and Angira Dhar in lead roles, with Gulshan Devaiah portraying the antagonist. Jammwal reprises his role as the commando Karan, who goes undercover with encounter specialist Bhavana Reddy for an anti-terrorist mission in London.

Principal photography for the film began in September 2018 in Bradford and York City in England. The film was theatrically released in India on 29 November 2019. A commercial success, it became the highest grossing film in the Commando film series.

Plot
The Mumbai Police force arrest three young terrorist suspects and interrogates them, but doesn't receive any information. Karanveer "Karan" Singh Dogra is called to help the cops, but one of the suspects kills himself. Upon further investigation, Karan learns the suspects received money and VHS tapes containing a terrorist's message. Also, one of the suspects talks repeatedly about 9/11, which is decoded as an attack on India on the day of Deepavali. 

Karan also learns that the recordings were actually shot by a camera in London, and decides to go undercover along with Bhavana Reddy, who assisted him on his previous mission. Posing as a married couple, they arrive in London where Mallika Sood, an MI6 officer, takes them to their work station where another agent named Armaan Akhtar assists them. On the other hand, the British terrorist Buraq Ansari forces his son Abeer to watch him kill a man. Abeer's mother and Buraq's ex-wife Zahira wants to contact the cops, but is threatened by Buraq. After learning that two Indian agents have arrived in London to capture him, Buraq enlists his agents's help to track them while Karan and his team go through the same process to follow Buraq's agents. 

While pursuing a suspect, Karan meets Zahira and Abeer and soon gets involved in a bike chase with the suspect, resulting in the latter's accidental death. Karan retrieves his phone and answers Buraq's call, further telling him he would soon visit the dead suspect's house. Karan and the team arrive at the home, but outside is stopped by Buraq's goons. A fight breaks out, resulting in Karan getting thrown out of the house by an explosion. The video goes viral, and so does Bhavana's tweet supporting Karan. It is revealed to be a part of Karan's plan when he releases a video challenging Buraq without disclosing his identity. When Buraq's DNA matches a murder suspect, Karan and his team rush to Buraq's restaurant but learns that he already left. 

Realizing that he would have gone to pick up Abeer from school, Karan arrives and challenges him before the latter disappears. Back in Mumbai, the two suspects are reformed by an Imam. Buraq is unwilling to leave Abeer and soon finds himself exposed when Karan holds a press conference with Abeer and Zahira. When Abeer and Zahira are being escorted safely to the airport, Buraq's henchmen attack the vehicles, where Bhavana is knocked out in the crash while Karan and Mallika fights off the henchmen. However, Zahira and Abeer are kidnapped, and Mallika is informed about Buraq's surrender. Karan tries to interrogate him but ends up using brute force, due to which he and Bhavana are ordered to leave London within 24 hours or face deportation.

Buraq is freed due to making a deal with the MI6 and provides the evidence of the previous attack in exchange for his freedom. On his way to a safe house, Buraq asks the officers to stop at a mosque, where he switches places with one of his henchmen and kills Zahira. Realizing the attack would be not on Deepavali but on Dussehra, Karan decides to continue alone, but is joined by his team. Through Abeer's tablet, the safe house is located and attacked by Bhavana and Mallika while Karan leaves to capture Buraq. Following the fight that leaves all the henchmen dead, Karan injects Buraq and takes him away. Bhavana and Mallika rescue Abeer, while Karan is safely picked up by his agency's helicopter and escorted to India's cargo ship. 

With minimal time remaining for the attacks, Karan and the cops try to find the targeted cities. Decoding spoken repeatedly by Buraq, Karan finds the targeted towns and releases a video requesting India's Muslims to understand the value of religious unity. The Muslims gear up to face the terrorists where they are joined by the cops and the terrorists are arrested. Karan kills Buraq and hands over Abeer to the dead suspect's father.

Cast
 Vidyut Jammwal as Commando Karanveer 'Karan' Singh Dogra
 Adah Sharma as Senior Inspector Bhavana Reddy, Anti-Terrorism Squad 
 Angira Dhar as British Intelligence Agent Mallika Sood 
 Gulshan Devaiah as Buraq Ansari, Zahira's ex-husband and Abeer's father
 Sumeet Thakur as British Intelligence Agent Armaan Akhtar
 Rajesh Tailang as Roy, Karan's boss
 Virendra Saxena as Ahmed
 Saahil Krishnani as Saahil
 Vibhawari Deshpande as Rajani
 Feryna Wazheir as Zahira, Buraq's ex-wife and Abeer's mother
 Abrar Zahoor as Tabish, Buraq's henchman
 Suresh Vishwakarma as Inspector Tukaram Tambe
 Abhilash Chaudhary as Taimur Khan
 Manuj Sharma as Subhan
 Raghav Dheer as Umar/Rakesh
 Prashant Jha as Usman/Amit
 Mark Bennington as Alvin, Mallika's boss
 Atharva Vishwakarma as Abeer, Buraq and Zahira's son
 R.Bhakti Klein as British Intelligence Agent
 Gracy Goswami as School student

Production

Development 
The success of first two Commando series made the producer Vipul Amrutlal Shah to go for third franchise. On 6 September 2018 it was announced to start Commando 3 with Vidyut Jammwal.

Filming 
Later in September filming began in London, England. The filming wrapped up in mid June 2019.

Soundtrack

This music of the film is composed by Mannan Shaah and Vikram Montrose with lyrics written by Sahil Sultanpuri, Abhendra Kumar Upadhyay, Azeem Shirazi, Farhad Bhiwandiwala and Vikram Montrose.

Release

Theatrical 
The film was released on 29 November 2019.

Home media 
It was made available as VOD on streaming platform ZEE5 starting on 20 February 2020.

Reception

Box office
Commando 3s opening day domestic collection was 4.74 crore. On the second day, the film collected ₹5.64 crore. On the third day, the film collected ₹7.95 crore, taking the total opening weekend collection to ₹18.33 crore.

The film has a gross collection of  38.65 crore in India and 1.50 crore overseas, making a worldwide gross collection of 40.15 crores.

Awards and nominations
The Andy Long stunt team, Amin, and Varma were nominated for the Filmfare Award for Best Action.

References

External links 

 
 

2010s Hindi-language films
2019 action thriller films
2019 films
Reliance Entertainment films
Films scored by Mannan Shaah
Films scored by Vikram Montrose
Indian sequel films
Indian action thriller films
Films about terrorism
Films set in London
Films shot in Bradford
Films shot in York
Films shot in West Yorkshire
Films shot in North Yorkshire
Films shot in Yorkshire